I Left My Grandfather's House is an uncompleted autobiographical novel by the English author and painter Denton Welch. 

Written in March 1943 and left incomplete at the time of his death in 1948, it is an account of a walking tour Welch took in the summer of 1933, when he was eighteen. His travels took him from his grandfather's house in Henfield, West Sussex, through Hampshire, Wiltshire, Somerset and Devon, before returning to Henfield. The account of a second leg, in which he intended to follow the Pilgrims' Way, ends at Cocking.

Summary
Picaresque and episodic in nature, Denton's adventures include encounters with a tramp, a young man who attempts to con him out of money, various (sometimes none-too-hospitable) youth hostel proprietors and members of his own extended family, invariably on a quest for a bed for the night. Parts of the journey are lost to him, as he frankly remarks in the narrative: recounting his arrival at Castle Cary, Somerset ("I think because I liked the name") he states that "I can remember nothing until I emerged at the market place at Dunster" some 50 miles away. There is a similar gap between Salcombe, Devon and Taunton, although in this instance he recalls an episode walking part of the way "with a boy from Bermondsey." Eventually running out of money, he gets some financial assistance from a youth hostel proprietor in Winchester to catch a train back to Henfield, where reminders of his unsatisfactory life there (in particular his indifferent aunt), prompt another odyssey, this time from Winchester to Canterbury.

Background
Welch did not return to the account, which he had entered in his journal for March 1943. The narrative concludes as he is engaged in a watercolour painting of a view from Cocking churchyard.

As with much of Welch's unfinished writing, some of the material in this novel did have other incarnations: the incomplete short story "Full Circle" (which he wrote in 1942, before he started on this novel) is an expansion of the account of his first night away, when he slept rough in a barn in the company of the farmer's teenage son, although in that earlier tale it is more obviously fictionalised as a ghost story. Additionally, the second half of his completed and published short story "The Barn" (written around the same time as I Left My Grandfather's House) revisits the same theme, Denton becoming a nine-year-old and the teenager transformed into an older, but still youthful, tramp.

Editions
I Left My Grandfather's House was first printed in 1958 by the Lion and Unicorn Press at the RCA (the Journals having been published in abridged form 1952 without this text). Long unavailable thereafter, it was re-published in 1984 by Allison & Busby. Further editions were issued by Exact Change in 1999 (along with In Youth is Pleasure), the Tartarus Press (as part of a two-volume Welch anthology) in 2005 and the Enitharmon Press in 2006.

The 1958 edition includes an introduction by Welch's art-school friend Helen Roeder. Several letters Welch wrote to Roeder appear as an appendix, although these concern his first novel, Maiden Voyage, rather than this work. These did not feature in any of the subsequent editions.

References

British autobiographical novels
1958 British novels
Novels set in England
Unfinished novels
Books published posthumously